Pacific station is on the Canadian National Railway mainline in Pacific, British Columbia, on the north side of the Skeena River, across the river from Highway 16 (no bridge or ferry access). The area is only accessible by rail. The station is served by Via Rail's Jasper–Prince Rupert train as a flag stop.

Footnotes

External links 
Via Rail Station Description

Via Rail stations in British Columbia